Psychrobacter aquimaris is a Gram-negative, non-spore-forming, nonmotile bacterium of the genus Psychrobacter which was isolated from the South Sea in Korea.

References

Further reading

External links
Type strain of Psychrobacter aquimaris at BacDive -  the Bacterial Diversity Metadatabase

Moraxellaceae
Bacteria described in 2005